System 12 may refer to

Namco System 12, a video game board.
IBM Business System 12, a relational database management system.
ITT System 12 was an early digital telephone exchange, by ITT Corporation